= Loving Fork, Virginia =

Unincorporated community in Virginia, United States

Coordinates: 38°05′47″N 77°21′11″W

Loving Fork is an unincorporated community in Caroline County, in the U.S. state of Virginia.
